Katandra is a small town in Victoria, Australia. It is located in the City of Greater Shepparton. It is the hometown of David Teague, former AFL player and coach, as well as Lachlan Ash, who plays Australian rules football for the Greater Western Sydney Giants.

References

Towns in Victoria (Australia)
City of Greater Shepparton